Dadawa a.k.a. Zhu Zheqin (朱哲琴) (born 15 July 1968) is a Chinese musician, sound artist and independent producer. She has also served as a UNDP Goodwill Ambassador.  Dadawa established SOUND LAB at Shanghai’s Tongji University, Institute of Architecture and Design, where she is an adjunct professor.
 
Over the past 20 years, with music as her point of departure, Dadawa is noted for her crossover artistic exploration. She was the first Chinese musician to release her music globally, beginning with “Sister Drum”, distributed by Warner Bros in 1995. As an avant garde pioneer of contemporary Chinese music, her works have entered the fields of sound as well as design, and visual, public, community and performance art.
 
In recent years, Dadawa has sought to bring together traditional craftsmanship and contemporary design. KANJIAN, a brand she established in 2012, combines contemporary design with traditional Chinese artisanal craftsmanship. KANJIAN creations are distinguished by their references to Chinese history, philosophy and aesthetics.

Dadawa‘s representative music and sound art works  
 Yellow Children (1992)
 Sister Drum 1995
 Voices from the sky 1997
 Seven Days 2006
 Moonrise 2010
 Sense of Hearing 2014 
 Fuchun Mountain Soundscape 2016
 Sound Script after Book from the Sky 2018 for Xu Bing UCCA Solo exhibition 
 Bell Shelter”for Setouchi Triennial Japan 2019

References

Sources 
Setouchi Triennial 2019
Moonrise – Dadawa and Ethnic Music Masters
'Chinese World Music' Act Dadawa Drums Up Acclaim

Living people
Chinese women singers
Sire Records artists
Chinese pop singers
Musicians from Guangzhou
Singers from Guangdong
1968 births